Scott Leon Willis (born 20 February 1982 in Liverpool) is an English footballer who played in the Football League for Carlisle United and Lincoln City, where he was part of the team that reached the Division Three play-off final in the 2002–03 season.

Willis signed for Witton Albion in June 2008.

References

External links
 

1982 births
Living people
Footballers from Liverpool
English footballers
Association football midfielders
Wigan Athletic F.C. players
Mansfield Town F.C. players
Doncaster Rovers F.C. players
Carlisle United F.C. players
Bamber Bridge F.C. players
Droylsden F.C. players
Lincoln City F.C. players
Stockport County F.C. players
Northwich Victoria F.C. players
Hereford United F.C. players
Halifax Town A.F.C. players
Runcorn F.C. Halton players
Stalybridge Celtic F.C. players
Vauxhall Motors F.C. players
Workington A.F.C. players
Leigh Genesis F.C. players
AFC Telford United players
Witton Albion F.C. players